Agriades zullichi (Zullich's blue) is a species of butterfly in the family Lycaenidae. It is endemic to Spain.

References

Agriades
Endemic fauna of Spain
Butterflies of Europe
Butterflies described in 1933
Taxonomy articles created by Polbot
Taxobox binomials not recognized by IUCN